Wieniotowo  is a village in the administrative district of Gmina Ustronie Morskie, within Kołobrzeg County, West Pomeranian Voivodeship, in north-western Poland. Wieniotowo has a population of 720.

See also
History of Pomerania.

References

Wieniotowo